A marshal is a holder of various military, law-enforcement and other positions.

Marshal may also refer to:

Role or profession
 Marshal (university), a university official in Sri Lanka
 Marshal of the air force and Air marshal, senior air force officer ranks 
 Field marshal, a senior army officer rank 
 Fire marshal, a fire safety inspector
 Motorsport marshal, a motor racing steward
 Sky marshal, a covert law enforcement agent on board an aircraft
 U.S. Marshal, of the United States Marshals Service

People
 Marshal (surname), including a list of people with the name

Arts, entertainment and media 
 Chapter 9: The Marshal, 2020 episode of The Mandalorian
 Cobb Vanth, the titular character of the episode.
 Marshal (Dungeons & Dragons), a character in the role-playing game
 Marshal (Pokémon), a Pokémon character
 Marshal (2002 film), a Hindi-language feature film
 Marshal (2019 film), a Telugu language thriller film 
 The Marshal, a 1912 book by Mary Raymond Shipman Andrews
 The Marshal, a 1995 American TV show
 Marshal (chess piece), a fairy chess piece

See also 

 Marshall (disambiguation)
 Marshalling (disambiguation)
 Martial (disambiguation)